Minor Love is Adam Green's sixth solo record, released by Rough Trade Records in Europe on January 8, 2010, and in the U.K. on January 11, 2010. It was released in the U.S. on February 16, 2010. The album supposedly showcases "a tender side of the often arrogant and emotionally unavailable bully/singer" and was recorded "in a total state of isolation."

Track listing
 "Breaking Locks" - 2:21
 "Give Them a Token" - 2:13
 "Buddy Bradley" - 2:00
 "Goblin" - 1:50
 "Bathing Birds" - 2:14
 "What Makes Him Act So Bad" - 2:17
 "Stadium Soul" - 2:34
 "Cigarette Burns Forever" - 1:56
 "Boss Inside" - 2:06
 "Castles and Tassels" - 2:45
 "Oh Shucks" - 1:58
 "Don't Call Me Uncle" - 2:57
 "Lockout" - 2:09
 "You Blacken My Stay" - 2:18

Charts

References

Adam Green (musician) albums
2010 albums
Rough Trade Records albums